Viktor Engel (born 23 September 1946) is a German sports shooter. He competed in the men's 25 metre rapid fire pistol event at the 1984 Summer Olympics.

References

External links
 

1946 births
Living people
German male sport shooters
Olympic shooters of West Germany
Shooters at the 1984 Summer Olympics
Sportspeople from Mecklenburg-Western Pomerania
20th-century German people